The women's slopestyle competition in freestyle skiing at the 2022 Winter Olympics was held on 14 February (qualification) and 15 February (final), at the Genting Snow Park in Zhangjiakou. Originally scheduled for 13 February (qualification) and 14 February (final), the events were delayed due to weather. Mathilde Gremaud of Switzerland won the event, improving on her 2018 silver medal. Eileen Gu of China won the silver medal, and Kelly Sildaru of Estonia bronze. For Sildaru, it was the first Olympic medal. This was also the first Winter Olympics medal for Estonia since 2010.

The defending champion was Sarah Höfflin, who returned but did not qualify for the final. The bronze medalist, Isabel Atkin, qualified for the Olympics as well, but did not participate in the event. At the 2021–22 FIS Freestyle Ski World Cup, there were only three races held before the Olympics, and two of them were won by Sildaru who was leading the rankings. Gu was the 2021 X-Games winner, with Atkin second, and the 2021 world champion, with Gremaud second.

Qualification

A total of 30 athletes qualified to compete at the games. For an athlete to compete they must have a minimum of 50.00 FIS points on the FIS Points List on January 17, 2022 and a top 30 finish in a World Cup event or at the FIS Freestyle Ski World Championships 2021 in either big air or slopestyle. A country could enter a maximum of four athletes into the event.

Results

Qualification
 Q — Qualified for the Final

The top 12 athletes in the qualifiers move on to the medal round.

Final
Marin Hamill advanced to the final but could not compete due to an injury.

References

Women's freestyle skiing at the 2022 Winter Olympics